NA-113 Sheikhupura-I is a constituency for the National Assembly of Pakistan.

Area
During the delimitation of 2018, NA-119 Sheikhupura-I acquired areas from three former constituencies namely NA-131 Sheikhupura-I, NA-132 (Sheikhupura-II-cum-Nankana Sahib), and NA-133 (Sheikhupura-III) with most areas coming from NA-131 (Sheikhupura-I). Muridke Tehsil was previously divided in all these three constituencies which is now entirely part of NA-119 (Sheikhupura-I). Apart from that, areas of Ferozewala Tehsil which were previously part of NA-131 (Sheikhupura-I) have been made part of this constituency. Those areas include Chak No.
46 Union Council among others.

Members of Parliament

2018-2022: NA-119 Sheikhupura-I

Election 2002 

General elections were held on 10 Oct 2002. Brig(R) Zulfiqar Ahmad of PML-Q won by 41,699 votes.

Election 2008 

General elections were held on 18 Feb 2008. Rana Tanveer Hussain of PML-N won by 50,638 votes.

Election 2013 

General elections were held on 11 May 2013. Rana Afzal Hussain of PML-N won by 73,742 votes and became a member of the National Assembly.

Election 2018 

General elections were held on 25 July 2018.

See also
NA-112 Nankana Sahib-II
NA-114 Sheikhupura-II

References

External links 
 Election result's official website

NA-119